Ceratodiscus is a genus of tropical and subtropical land snails with an operculum, terrestrial gastropod mollusks in the family Helicinidae.

Ceratodiscus is the type genus of the subfamily Ceratodiscinae.

Species 
Species within the genus Ceratodiscus include:
 Ceratodiscus minimus (Gundlach in Pfeiffer, 1859)

References 

Helicinidae